The chemical compound 5-methyluridine (symbol m⁵U or m5U), also called ribothymidine, is a pyrimidine nucleoside. It is the ribonucleoside counterpart to the deoxyribonucleoside thymidine, which lacks a hydroxyl group at the 2' position.  5-Methyluridine contains a thymine base joined to a ribose pentose sugar. It is a white solid.

See also
 5-Methylcytosine
 3-Methyluridine

References

 
Nucleosides
Pyrimidinediones